Heybat Beyglu (also Romanized as Heybat Beyglū; also known as Heibat Bakloo, Heybat Beglū, Heybat Beyg, Heybat Beyk, Kheibashbai, Kheybashbay, and Kheyr Bāsh Beyk) is a village in Ozomdel-e Jonubi Rural District, in the Central District of Varzaqan County, East Azerbaijan Province, Iran. At the 2006 census, its population was 130, in 28 families.

References 

Towns and villages in Varzaqan County